The  is a group of Kofun to early Nara period  burial mound cluster located in the Koshinohara neighborhood of the city of Yasu, Shiga in the Kansai region of Japan. It was designated a National Historic Site of Japan in 1941, wth the area under designation expanded in 1982, 1983 and 1995.

Overview
The Ōiwayama Kofun Cluster is located in a fertile alluvial plain formed by the Yasu River. In 1881, 14 dōtaku were discovered on Mount Ōiwa, and ten more were found in two separate locations in 1962 during construction work on the tracks of the Tōkaidō Shinkansen. These artifacts date from the late Yayoi period and the fact that they were buried intentionally was interpreted to be an indication of the unsettled political condition during the transition between the Yayoi and Kofun periods. The very large concentration was also interpreted to indicate that a large regional tribe or clan lived in this area, and this theory was supported by a large concentration of burial mounds in the flatlands surrounding Mount Ōiwa. 

The Ōiwayama Kofun Cluster consists 17 confirmed tumuli, from the latter half of the 3rd century to the 6th century AD, or spanning the end of the Yayoi to the end of the Kofun period. The , another zenpō-kōhō-fun was discovered in 1982 and added to the National Historic Site designation the same year. In 1985, six previously unknown tumuli were discovered and were also added to the area under protection, which then received the collective name of "Ōiwayama Kofun Cluster". The borders of the area under protection were adjusted in 1995. The site is now part of the Sakuraba-sama Historical Park, and is a short walk from the "Dotaku Museum Mae" bus stop on the Omi Railway bus from Yasu Station on the JR West Tōkaidō Main Line. Artifacts uncovered during archaeological excavations have included bronze mirrors, earthenware, haniwa and Sue ware pottery.

Gallery

See also
List of Historic Sites of Japan (Shiga)

References

External links

Shiga Prefecture Department of Education 

Kofun
Archaeological sites in Japan
History of Shiga Prefecture
Yasu, Shiga
Historic Sites of Japan